Radio Star is a South Korean talk show hosted by Kim Gook-jin, Kim Gura, Ahn Young-mi, and Yoo Se-yoon. It airs on MBC on Wednesdays at 10:30(KST). The first episode aired on May 30, 2007, making it one of the longest-running talk shows in the country.

Cast

Host
 Current
 Kim Gook-jin
 Kim Gura
 Ahn Young-mi
 Yoo Se-yoon
 Former
 Shindong (Super Junior)
 Shin Jung-hwan
 Kim Hee-chul (Super Junior)
 Cho Kyu-hyun (Super Junior)
 Cha Tae-hyun
 Yoon Jong-shin

Timeline

List of episodes

Ratings 

2000s

2010s

2020s

Awards and nominations

References

External links
 

2007 South Korean television series debuts
2010s South Korean television series
Korean-language television shows
South Korean television talk shows
South Korean variety television shows
MBC TV original programming